Rugby League Deutschland was the governing body for the sport of rugby league football in Germany. The Association was formed in 2007.  It folded in March 2015, and was replaced by the Nationaler Rugby League Deutschland e.V. (NRLD).  The NRLD became an affiliate member of the RLEF in December 2017.

See also

 Rugby league in Germany
 Germany national rugby league team

References

External links

Rugby league governing bodies in Europe
Rugby league in Germany
Rugby League
Sports organizations established in 2007